opened in Moriyama, Shiga Prefecture, Japan on 22 March 1998. The museum stages temporary exhibitions and houses a permanent collection which includes a bronze bell dating to 858 that has been designated a National Treasure.

See also

 List of National Treasures of Japan (crafts: others)

References

External links
  Sagawa Art Museum
  Sagawa Art Museum
 Sagawa Art Museum at Google Cultural Institute

Museums in Shiga Prefecture
Art museums established in 1998
1998 establishments in Japan
Art museums and galleries in Japan
Moriyama, Shiga